Tanghulu or Tang hulu, also called bingtang hulu, is a traditional Northern Chinese snack consisting of several rock sugar-coated fruits of Chinese hawthorn (Crataegus pinnatifida) on a bamboo skewer. It is named for its calabash-like shape. Tanghulu is called Tang dun er (simplified Chinese: 糖墩儿) in Tianjin, Tang qiu (simplified Chinese: 糖球) in Fengyang, Anhui, Tang zhan er (simplified Chinese: 糖蘸儿) in Shandong. Tanghulu is often mistaken for regular candied fruits; however, it is coated in a hardened sugar syrup. This sweet and sour treat has been made since the Song Dynasty and remains popular throughout northern China.

Chinese hawthorn is the traditional fruit used for the skewering of fruit, but in recent times vendors have also used various other fruits, such as cherry tomatoes, mandarin oranges, strawberries, blueberries, pineapples, kiwifruit, bananas, or grapes. The pits and seeds of the hawthorn are emptied out and are commonly filled with sweet red bean paste before being skewered and dipped.

Origin 

During the Southern Song Dynasty, the emperor Song Guangzong (simplified Chinese: 宋光宗) has very beloved Imperial concubine named Huang Guifei. However, one day, Huang was sick, she refused to eat or drink all day long, and it seemed like she was about to die at any moment. The palace doctors all had no ideas how to cure her, so Song Guangzong spent a lot of money to seek for medical help. Later, a doctor came to the palace and treated Huang. He ordered people to cook the hawthorn, with rock sugar and have Huang take five to ten of them before each meal. Surprisingly, after a few days, Huang gradually recovered. Everyone thought this method was quite novel, so the prescription was passed down. Later, people began to string the fruit together and sell it on the street, which is now known as tanghulu.

Nutrition values and Cautions 
Tanghulu is rich in Vitamin C, pectin and chlorogenic acid, caffeic acid, hawthorn acid, zithromax acid, quercetin, ursolic acid, oleanolic acid, chrysin, epicatechin and other organic acids and nutritional elements. Tanghulu has no coloring or food additives, with good taste. It is a kind of natural nutritious food. The Chinese Hawthorn has many medicinal effects, it can eliminate food stagnation and stop dysentery, especially to help digestion. It has become an important medicine since ancient times. in addition, hawthorn can lower blood lipids, lower cholesterol and other effects. However, not everyone is suitable for long-term eating tanghulu. Because it contains rock sugar, diabetics should eat with caution. People with weak spleen and stomach and heartburn should not eat too much hawthorn tanghulu.

Cooking Steps 

 Prepare about 30 hawthorns (or any other fruit you like), rock candy 150 grams, and water 150 grams.
 Dry the hawthorns after washing them, use a hard straw to easily remove the pits and seeds by poking it into the center.
 String all the hawthorn fruits together with bamboo skewers. It is best to first sterilize the bamboo skewers by boiling them in hot water for hygiene purposes.
 Put 150 grams of rock sugar in a shallow pot. Then pour 150 grams of water into the pot. Heat the sugar with high heat until it boils, and then cook until all the sugar has melted.
 When you see big bubbles appear in the pot, immediately change to low heat. Slowly simmer over low heat until the syrup in the pot produces a large amount of bubbles and turns slightly yellow in color. This is when the syrup is almost ready.
 Roll the hawthorn skewer quickly in the bubbles on the surface of the syrup to form a thin glassy layer on the hawthorn surface. The whole process must be very fast.
 After wrapping with syrup, place them on wax paper and leave some space between each one to avoid sticking. After cooling, the syrup will solidify, and then you can start eating.

Gallery

See also
 Candy apple
 Rock candy
 Ligao Tang
 List of Chinese desserts

References

External links
 

Chinese confectionery
Fruit dishes
Skewered foods